The Digital Humanities Summer Institute (DHSI) is an annual digital humanities training program held in June at the University of Victoria, British Columbia, Canada. DHSI now attracts over 600 participants for two weeks of courses, forum discussions, paper sessions, and unconferences. DHSI has an International Advisory Board.

In both the past and present, major overarching themes of DHSI have included collaboration, interdisciplinarity, and the creation and cultivation of a larger Digital Humanities community beyond the structure of the typical academic environment. It has been especially noted that DHSI encourages opportunities for digital humanists at all stages of their careers, levels of expertise in the field, and roles in the contribution to the Digital Humanities to engage and network with each other.

DHSI's course offerings run parallel to the DHSI Conference & Colloquium, formerly known as the DHSI Colloquium. Founded in 2009 by Diane Jakacki and Cara                Leitch, the event invited graduate-only submissions until 2011.

History
DHSI started in 2001 at Vancouver Island University. The inaugural DHSI event included lead speakers Susan Hockey, Nancy Ide, Willard McCarty, and John Unsworth, and there were some 35 participants in attendance. In 2004, DHSI moved to the University of Victoria, where it currently resides. It is estimated that, as of 2012, there were approximately 1,800 alumni of the institute, with a large portion returning over a period of multiple years to take further courses.

References

University of Victoria
Digital humanities